Lastushinsky is a rural locality (a khutor) in Kletsko-Pochtovskoye Rural Settlement, Serafimovichsky District, Volgograd Oblast, Russia. The population was 21 as of 2010. There are 2 streets.

Geography 
Lastushinsky is located 85 km southeast of Serafimovich (the district's administrative centre) by road. Podpeshinsky is the nearest rural locality.

References 

Rural localities in Serafimovichsky District